Giuseppe Maria Ficatelli (1639 – 3 September 1703) was an Italian painter of the Baroque period.

Not to be confused with the mathematician Giuseppe Maria Figatelli (1611 – 1682).

Biography
He was born in Cento, and pupil of Cesare Gennari, flourished in the latter half of the 17th century, and painted pictures for the churches of his native city. His sons, Paolo Antonio (1671 – 17 February 1724) and Stefano Felice Ficatelli (8 April 1686 – 5 September 1771), inherited his studio and were active local painters.

References

17th-century Italian painters
Italian male painters
Italian Baroque painters
People from Cento
Painters from Ferrara
1639 births
1703 deaths
Scientists from Ferrara